Oenopotella is a genus of sea snails, marine gastropod mollusks in the family Mangeliidae.

Species
 Oenopotella ultraabyssalis Sysoev, 1988

References

 Sysoev, AV. "Ultra-abyssal Findings of Mollusks of the Family Turridae (Gastropoda, Toxoglossa) in the Pacific Ocean" Zoologichesky Zhurnal 67.7 (1988): 965-973.

External links
 
 Worldwide Mollusc Species Data Base: Mangeliidae
 Bouchet, P.; Kantor, Y. I.; Sysoev, A.; Puillandre, N. (2011). A new operational classification of the Conoidea (Gastropoda). Journal of Molluscan Studies. 77(3): 273-308

 
Gastropod genera